Leontin Doană (born 17 January 1970) is a Romanian former professional footballer, currently a manager. He was part of one of the best football generation of CSM Reșița with players like Roco Sandu, Vasile Ciocoi or Cristian Chivu.

References

External links
 

1970 births
Living people
People from Reșița
Romanian footballers
Association football midfielders
Liga I players
Liga II players
CSM Reșița players
CSM Deva players
Romanian football managers
CSM Reșița managers